Blastochloris gulmargensis is a gram-negative, motile bacteria from the genus of Blastochloris which was isolated from biofilm in a cold sulfur spring in Gulmarg in India.

References

External links
Type strain of Blastochloris gulmargensis at BacDive -  the Bacterial Diversity Metadatabase

Hyphomicrobiales
Bacteria described in 2011